The Witcher Adventure Game is a board game set in the universe of The Witcher. A tabletop version was created by CD Projekt Red and Fantasy Flight Games. A digital video game version was developed by CD Projekt Red and Can Explode Games.

Gameplay
The Witcher Adventure Game is a board game set in the universe of The Witcher. The video game version can be played alone against AI opponents or in local and online multiplayer.

Development
The tabletop version of The Witcher Adventure Game was developed by CD Projekt Red and Fantasy Flight Games. It was released on 26 November 2014. The digital video version was developed by CD Projekt Red and Can Explode Games. It was announced in June 2014, and released for OS X, Windows, Android, and iOS on 27 November 2014.

Reception

The Witcher Adventure Game received "mixed or average" reviews from professional critics according to review aggregator website Metacritic.

References

External links
 

2014 video games
Android (operating system) games
Board games introduced in 2014
Fantasy board games
iOS games
Licensed board games
MacOS games
Multiplayer and single-player video games
The Witcher (video game series)
Video board games
Video games developed in Poland
Windows games
CD Projekt games